Mohammad Jalal Abbasi-Shavazi (born 23 August 1965) is an Iranian demographer and the president of Asian Population Association. He is a Professor of the Department of Demography and Chair of the Division of Population Research of the University of Tehran.

Awards
He was awarded the 2011 United Nations Population Award.
Abbasi Shavazi won Iran's Book of the Year Award for the book The Fertility Transition in Iran: Revolution and Reproduction (with Meimanat Hosseini-Chavoshi and Peter Francis McDonald).

References

Living people
1965 births
People from Yazd
University of Tehran alumni
Academic staff of the Faculty of World Studies
Australian National University alumni
Academic staff of the University of Tehran
Iranian demographers
Faculty of Social Sciences of the University of Tehran alumni